Katherine Margaret Jacewicz (born 6 April 1985) is an Australian soccer referee. She was first FIFA listed in 2011.

Refereeing career
Jacewicz began refereeing at the age of 13 when her brother's team needed a referee.

After being appointed to referee the 2019 W-League Grand Final, this was her ninth final out of the first eleven seasons of the W-League, which was rebranded in 2021 as A-League Women.

She became a FIFA referee in 2011, and was in charge of the Final of the 2016 FIFA U-17 Women's World Cup in Jordan. 

Jacewicz was selected as one of the 27 referees for the 2019 FIFA Women's World Cup. After the conclusion of the round of 16, Jacewicz was retained as one of 11 officials to be assigned matches for the remainder of the tournament.

In the 2019–20 A-League season Jacewicz became the first woman to referee a match in the A-League, when she took charge of the Melbourne City match against Newcastle Jets.

References

1985 births
Australian soccer referees
Women association football referees
Living people
A-League Women referees
Australian people of Polish descent
FIFA Women's World Cup referees
Australian women referees and umpires